Ronald Spuller (born 22 June 1981) is an Austrian professional association football player. He plays as an attacking midfielder.

1981 births
Living people
Austrian footballers
Association football forwards
SV Mattersburg players
Austrian Football Bundesliga players